The 2014 Monmouth Hawks football team represented Monmouth University in the 2014 NCAA Division I FCS football season. They were led by 22nd-year head coach Kevin Callahan and played their home games at Kessler Field. After playing one season as in independent in 2013, they were first year members of the Big South Conference in 2014. Monmouth finished the season 6–5 overall and 1–4 in Big South play to place fifth.

Schedule

References

Monmouth
Monmouth Hawks football seasons
Monmouth Hawks football